Christian Taylor is a British-Argentine-American screenwriter, director, and producer known for his work on the American television series Lost, Six Feet Under, Teen Wolf, Clone Wars, Resident Alien, Eye Candy and the Award-winning independent film SHOWBOY which is codirected and starred in. Christian is a proud member of the LGBTQ+ community and actively works to encourage representation across Film and TV storytelling.

Early life
Taylor was born in London, England to an Argentine father and British mother. Soon after his birth, the family moved to Mexico City for three years. On their return to London, they lived in the culturally diverse and artistic community of Notting Hill. As a teenager, he went to Bedales School in Hampshire where both Daniel Day-Lewis and Minnie Driver attended. He did his art foundation course at the Central School of Art and Design and then moved to the United States after being accepted by New York University TIsch School of the Arts.

Career
As a student at New York University, Taylor wrote and directed the thesis film, “The Lady in Waiting,” which won the gold medal for Best Dramatic Film at the Student Academy Awards and went on to be nominated for the Academy Award for Best Live-Action Short Film.

Taylor was integral to the development and shooting of the pilot of the HBO drama Six Feet Under in 2001, and went on to be a writer and a producer and received an Emmy Award nomination for Outstanding Drama Series in 2002. Taylor's script for the season 2 episode, “In Place of Anger,” was also nominated for a Writers Guild of America (WGA) Award in 2003.

He co-wrote, co-directed, and starred in the 2002 independent Mockumentary film, Showboy, which won the Douglas Hickox Award for best directorial debut at the British Independent Film Awards and was named Best Picture at the Milan International Film Festival.

In 2003, Taylor became a writer and producer on ABC's dramatic series Miracles, before beginning work on the first season of the network's breakout hit,  Lost.

As there was no Pilot shot, Taylor was one of only four writers brought on to brainstorm and develop what the show would eventually be.  As a writer and supervising producer on Lost, Taylor won the 2006 Writers Guild of America Award for Best Dramatic Series.

In 2008, he co-created Fox's sci-fi crime drama New Amsterdam.

He went on to become the head writer on Lucasfilm’s animated series, Star Wars: The Clone Wars writing episodes for the show’s third, fourth, and fifth seasons and received a 2015  Emmy Award nomination for Outstanding Writing in an Animated Program.

Taylor’s relationship with MTV began with the 2009 release of the horror miniseries, Valemont, which he wrote and co-directed.

He returned to MTV as a writer, director, and co-executive producer on Teen Wolf during the show’s second, third, and fourth seasons directing the fan-favorite episode called Motel California.

In 2014, Taylor developed and was showrunner and Executive producer of the MTV drama-thriller series Eye Candy, starring Victoria Justice.  Production began in New York City in September 2014, with Jax Media and the ten-episode first season was released in January 2015. The hugely popular show was canceled after MTV decided to stop producing or programing live action TV.

He went on to become CO-EP and writer on the Marvel series Luke Cage, which was released in 2018.

He was asked to return to Lucasfilm and wrote two episodes of The Bad Batch for season one of their animation series. 

He has been working on the critically acclaimed and hugely popular Resident Alien for SYFY and Amblin TV.   Resident Alien received the honor of Best Cable Series, Comedy from the Hollywood Critics Association for season one. The first part of season 2 premiered in January 2022 and the second part will be broadcast in late summer 2022.

Taylor is currently developing several pilots and recently completed a WW2 resistance film called the Degenerate set in Amsterdam which he will direct.

Filmography

Films

Television

References

External links
Academy Awards, USA

Primetime Emmy Awards

British Independent Film Awards

Daytime Emmy Awards

Milano International Film Festival Awards (MIFF Awards)

Online Film & Television Association

The Streamy Awards

Writers Guild of America, USA

Living people
British male screenwriters
LGBT film directors
LGBT television directors
English LGBT writers
Writers Guild of America Award winners
1968 births
21st-century LGBT people